Auraria Library is an academic library in downtown Denver, Colorado. It provides academic resources and research experiences to students, staff, and faculty at the University of Colorado Denver (CU Denver), the Metropolitan State University of Denver (MSU Denver), and the Community College of Denver (CCD) on the Auraria Higher Education Center (AHEC) campus, also called the Auraria Campus. The Library is administratively operated by CU Denver and occupies a building owned by the State of Colorado.

About one in five students in college in Colorado attend classes on the Auraria Campus. The combined tri-institutional census for fall 2012 reports 45,062 students attending the three institutions. The three institutions have combined populations of 15,903 minor students from a wide range of ethnic backgrounds, which represents thirty-five percent of the total student population. Seventy-six percent of the graduates remain in the Denver Metropolitan area, contributing to its economic and civic vitality.

The library is known for its association with Beall's List, created by its former faculty member Jeffrey Beall and used by universities and libraries worldwide.

Building
Auraria Library's $32.8 million renovation project came to a close in 2017. "The reconfigured and upgraded library, whose Lawrence Way entrance faces west under a colorful cayenne canopy, is now bright, roomy, innovative, study-friendly, artsy and still flexible enough to meet the changing needs of 21st century college students."

The building was originally designed by internationally recognized architect Helmut Jahn. Its design excellence was recognized by the Chicago chapter of the American Institute of Architects (AIA) in 1978. In 2009, it earned the Denver AIA 25-year Award, which recognizes the enduring quality of architectural design that has withstood the “test of time” and still functions in its original capacity.

Renovation 
Auraria Library's $32.8 million renovation project was funded by $26.8 million in state funds and $6 million in cash contributions including donations. The renovation was broken down into five phases:
 2012-2011: Creating Community 
 2012: Transforming Learning Spaces
 2013: Discovering Possibilities
 2014: Exploring Library as Place
 2015-2016: Innovating Dreams
The renovation created more collaborative space, improved technology and added many student-friendly amenities.

Collections 
The Auraria Library houses approximately 650,000 print books and provides access to 206,000 ebooks, 87,000 ejournals, and 280 million electronic resource records through its Summon Discovery service. The Library maintains 580 journal and newspaper subscriptions and 822 database subscriptions; which are accessible to current students from its website. The library also has a sizable film and videotape collection which contains over 22,000 titles.

Notable faculty

Jeffrey Beall, founder of Beall's list

See also

References

External links

Center for Colorado & the West at Auraria Library

University and college academic libraries in the United States
Libraries in Colorado
Auraria Campus
Buildings and structures in Denver
Education in Denver
Metropolitan State University of Denver
University of Colorado
Libraries established in 1976